James Patrick Scullion (born 2 March 1986) is a retired professional Scottish footballer who is a Utility player, who used to manage for Inverkeithing Hillfield Swifts in the East of Scotland league.

Scullion has previously played with Dunfermline Athletic, Elgin City, Cowdenbeath, Alloa Athletic, Stenhousemuir, Clyde, Berwick Rangers and Edinburgh City. During his stint at Clyde, he adopted the nickname "Sausage Supper" among the Clyde support, a Scottish delicacy enjoyed by many including Kevin Patrick Thacker. During Scullion's spell, Clyde were a poor football side. This left Scullion disgruntled, and he had to be bribed to stay by being given chocolates.

Football career
Scullion began his career with his local side Dunfermline Athletic, making only one appearance for his home town team before joining Elgin City in May 2005. He left Elgin during the Winter transfer window of 2006, signing for Cowdenbeath until he moved to Alloa Athletic in July 2008. Scullion also spent time with Stenhousemuir and Clyde, before signing for Cowdenbeath for a second time on 1 September 2014, having left Clyde on 27 August 2014.

Scullion subsequently spent two seasons with Cowdenbeath, before being released at the end of the 2015–16 season, and re-signing for Alloa Athletic on a short-term deal in August 2016. After making just one appearance for the Wasps, Scullion was loaned out to Scottish League Two side Berwick Rangers in December 2016 on an emergency loan deal until the end of January 2017. With his contract at Recreation Park about to expire, Scullion moved to Berwick permanently on 27 January 2017. After just under a year, Berwick announced that he had left the club by mutual consent. Scullion was without a club for just a short period of time, signing for fellow League Two side Edinburgh City on 1 January 2018, before being released at the end of the season. Scullion returned to Cowdenbeath eventually leaving again in January 2019. He trialed for a few Lowland league teams before signing for Gala Fairydean until the end of the season.

Scullion signed with Linlithgow Rose on 29 June 2019 and left the club on 2 November 2020.

Career statistics

References

External links

1986 births
Living people
Scottish footballers
Dunfermline Athletic F.C. players
Elgin City F.C. players
Cowdenbeath F.C. players
Alloa Athletic F.C. players
Stenhousemuir F.C. players
Clyde F.C. players
Berwick Rangers F.C. players
F.C. Edinburgh players
Linlithgow Rose F.C. players
Scottish Football League players
Scottish Premier League players
Footballers from Dunfermline
Association football midfielders
Scottish Professional Football League players